Samuel Román Rojas (December 8, 1907 - April 7, 1990) was a Chilean sculptor. He won the National Prize of Art of Chile in 1964.

References

1907 births
1990 deaths
People from Rancagua
University of Chile alumni
Chilean sculptors
Male sculptors
20th-century sculptors
Chilean male artists